Saeki (written: ,  or  in katakana) is a Japanese surname. Notable people with the surname include:

, Japanese singer
, Japanese admiral
, Japanese actress
, Japanese footballer
, Japanese singer and voice actress
, Japanese boxer
, Japanese novelist
, Japanese film director
, Japanese tennis player
, Japanese footballer
 P. Y. Saeki (1871–1965), Japanese scholar
, Japanese voice actress
, Japanese painter

Fictional characters 
, a character in the film series Ju-on
, a character in the film series Ju-on
, a character in the film series Ju-on
, a character in the anime "Vivy: Fluorite Eye's Song"

Japanese-language surnames